Acts 29 is a global family of church planting churches that adheres to Calvinist theology. It derives its name from the Book of Acts in the New Testament, which has 28 chapters, making Acts 29 the "next chapter" in the history of the church. A number of other Christian organizations also use the phrase "Acts 29" in their respective names.

History 
Acts 29 was founded in 1998 by Mark Driscoll and David Nicholas. Beginning September 17, 2007, with the Raleigh Boot Camp, Acts 29 began using Great Commission Ministries as its mission agency for fundraising and leadership training. Matt Chandler was appointed as the president of Acts 29 Network in 2012. Chandler announced plans to keep the network's objectives intact while reorganizing to address the global scope of the organization. The offices and leadership of Acts 29 moved from Mars Hill Church in Seattle to The Village Church in Texas in March 2012.

In August 2014, Acts 29 removed Mark Driscoll and Mars Hill Church from its membership. According to the Acts 29 Board, this was due to "the nature of the accusations against Mark, most of which have been confirmed by him." Subsequent years saw the network restructure, with a focus on diversification, financial accountability and devolved leadership, transforming "from an American-based network to a diverse global family of church-planting churches".

Board members 

As of May 28, 2020, Acts 29's board consisted of these members:

 Matt Chandler | Board Member and President | Lead Pastor at The Village Church in Dallas, TX
 Dwayne Bond | Board Member | Lead Pastor at Wellspring Church in Charlotte, NC
 Gareth Paul | Board Member
 Ryan Kwon | Board Member | Lead Pastor at Resonate Church in Fremont, CA
 Vic Keller | Board Member
 Sergio Queiroz | Board Member | Lead Pastor at Primeira Igreja Batista do Bessamar in Brasil

Character 

Acts 29 is a global family of church planting churches that originated in North America and now has representation in Europe, Australia and New Zealand, Latin and South America, Africa, and Asia.

Acts 29 has been described as part of the emerging church. However, Darrin Patrick, Former Vice President of Acts 29 has pointed out "bad things" in the emerging church such as "the fascination with deconstructing almost everything while building almost nothing," and "ugly things" such as "conversing about God's Word [the Bible] to the neglect of obeying it, deviating from historical orthodoxy and the lack of clarity regarding issues of theology and sexuality."

Four Values of Acts 29 

In 2012, Matt Chandler became the President of Acts 29 and outlined four values for the future of Acts 29. As he states, "these aren't complex and seem to me to be no-brainers, even though it might take years before some of them are a reality. I will be and am currently putting my efforts and influence to work in these directions."

Planting Churches that Plant Churches
Pursuing Holiness and Humility
Being a Radically Diverse and Global Community
Praying for Conversions Through Evangelism

The full brief on "The Four Values For Acts 29" can be found on the website of the Acts 29 Network.

The Mission of Acts 29 

In March 2019, Acts 29 included 740 churches on six continents. The stated mission of Acts 29 is to be a diverse, global family of church-planting churches characterized by theological clarity, cultural engagement and missional innovation. Acts 29 makes no claim to be a model or a style, stating "[W]e have churches with live preaching and others with video-delivered sermons. We have independent church plants, replants, and existing churches that want to focus on planting new churches out of their existing congregations. Simply, we seek to be a movement of church-planting churches." A number of Acts 29 churches belong to a denomination as well. For example, Christ the King Presbyterian Church in Raleigh, North Carolina is a member of the Presbyterian Church in America, while The Village Church is a member of the Southern Baptist Convention.

Reactions 

Steve Lemke of the New Orleans Baptist Theological Seminary cited interactions with Acts 29 instead of local Baptist churches on the part of Pleasant Valley Community Church in Owensboro, Kentucky as a reason they were denied acceptance into the Daviess–McLean Baptist Association, saying, "those who want to be accepted should make themselves acceptable." Roger Moran, a former member of the Southern Baptist Convention's executive committee and head of the Missouri Baptist Layman's Association has criticized Acts 29 on matters of doctrine, vulgarity and drinking. In his view, Acts 29 and other emerging church movements have become a "dangerous and deceptive infiltration of Baptist life". Christian Piatt of the Huffington Post has criticized the network for disguising the traditional evangelical agenda of conformity and conversion behind the veneer of the new missional church movement. He also criticizes the emphasis on male leadership.

Controversies 

Acts 29 churches have faced criticism for a number of high-profile church discipline issues. On 13 April 2016, Darrin Patrick was removed from his position at The Journey for misconduct and was required to step down from all external leadership positions. He is no longer listed as a member of the Acts 29 Board of Directors.
In February 2020, it was announced that Steve Timmis had been removed from the position of CEO of the Acts 29 Network amid allegations of an abusive leadership style; five staff members had previously raised similar concerns with Chandler in 2015, only to be fired and asked to sign non-disclosure agreements. Timmis is also no longer listed as a member of the Acts 29 Board of Directors.

Criticisms have also been made over how church discipline has been conducted. The Village Church in Dallas offered a general apology after a female member was disciplined for annulling her marriage to a man who admitted to viewing child pornography. No elders or leaders were removed from their offices, but the church said in an email that the action taken against the woman was "unbefitting" of a church leader.

See also
New Calvinism

References

External links 

 

Emerging church movement
Evangelical parachurch organizations
Calvinist organizations established in the 20th century
Christian organizations established in 1998
Mars Hill Church